Bossiaea distichoclada is a species of flowering plant in the family Fabaceae and is endemic to south-eastern continental Australia. It is an erect shrub with hairy branches, kidney-shaped to more or less round or heart-shaped leaves with the narrower end towards the base, and uniformly bright yellow flowers.

Description

Taxonomy and naming
Bossiaea distichoclada was first formally described in 1855 by Ferdinand von Mueller in his book Definitions of rare or hitherto undescribed Australian plants.

Distribution and habitat
This species grows in montane to subalpine woodland in north-eastern Victoria and far south-eastern New South Wales.

References 

distichoclada
Flora of Victoria (Australia)
Flora of New South Wales
Plants described in 1855
Taxa named by Ferdinand von Mueller